The 1911 Cork Intermediate Hurling Championship was the third staging of the Cork Intermediate Hurling Championship since its establishment by the Cork County Board.

On 22 October 1911, Cloughduv won the championship following a 6-02 to 3-01 defeat of Blackrock in the final at the Coachford Enclosure.

Results

Final

References

Cork Intermediate Hurling Championship
Cork Intermediate Hurling Championship